Gilles Martin Domoraud Danon Otto (born 15 February 1979) is an Ivorian former professional footballer who played as a defender.

Club career
Born in Man, Ivory Coast, Domoraud spent most of his career in Greece, including a season with Panionios F.C. in the Greek Super League. Domoraud played in France for Besançon (National) and Rouen (Ligue 2) and he played a season in Greek Cyprus for Nea Salamis. In July 2008, he joined Nyon from the French-speaking region of Switzerland.

International career
Domoraud made four appearances for the senior Ivory Coast national football team during 2003, including an 2004 African Cup of Nations qualifying match against South Africa on 22 June 2003.

Personal life
He is the brother of Jean-Jacques and Cyril.

References

External links

http://www.football.ch/sfl/1106/de/Kader.aspx?pId=788306

1979 births
Living people
People from Man, Ivory Coast
Association football defenders
Ivorian footballers
Ivorian expatriate footballers
Ivory Coast international footballers
French sportspeople of Ivorian descent
Racing Besançon players
Apollon Pontou FC players
Nea Salamis Famagusta FC players
PAS Giannina F.C. players
RC Strasbourg Alsace players
FC Stade Nyonnais players
FC Rouen players
Aris Thessaloniki F.C. players
Panionios F.C. players
Ligue 2 players
Super League Greece players
Cypriot First Division players
Expatriate footballers in Cyprus
Expatriate footballers in Greece
Expatriate footballers in Switzerland